Elliott Smith is a book about the musician Elliott Smith that was compiled by photographer Autumn de Wilde. The foreword was written by Beck and Chris Walla. The book was released in November 2007.

Interviewees 

Those interviewed for the book include:

 Joanna Bolme, Elliott's ex-girlfriend
 Neil Gust, Smith's friend and former bandmate
 Ashley Welch, Smith's sister
 Beck, musician
 Ben Gibbard and Chris Walla of Death Cab for Cutie
 Matthew Caws of Nada Surf
 Mark Flanagan, owner of Club Largo
 Sam Coomes, Smith's Heatmiser bandmate and bassist during the XO and Figure 8 tours
 Rob Schnapf, co-producer of XO and Figure 8
 Jon Brion, co-producer of Figure 8

Accompanying CD 

Included with the book is a five-song CD featuring previously unreleased live recordings of Smith performing acoustically at Club Largo in Los Angeles, CA on April 11, 1998. The track listing is as follows:

 "Angeles" (2:59)
 "Between the Bars" (2:27)
 "Clementine" (2:40)
 "Clouds" (Quasi cover) (2:29)
 "All My Rowdy Friends (Have Settled Down)" (Hank Williams Jr. cover) (3:39)

References 

 
 
 

2007 non-fiction books
Books about Elliott Smith